Lamprosema semicostalis is a moth of the family Crambidae. It is found in Brazil.

References

Moths described in 1899
Lamprosema
Moths of South America